Zalakeh-ye Vaziri (also Romanized as Zālakeh-ye Vazīrī; also known as Dālakeh-ye Vazīrī, Ẕālkeh-ye Kalb‘alī, and Z̄ālkey-ye Vazīrī) is a village in Mahidasht Rural District, Mahidasht District, Kermanshah County, Kermanshah Province, Iran. At the 2006 census, its population was 94, in 24 families.

References 

Populated places in Kermanshah County